America's Dumbest Criminals is an American reality series that aired in syndication from September 21, 1996, to May 27, 2000, for a total of 104 episodes. For international syndication the show was titled Everyone's Dumbest Criminals. The show ultimately aired in 30 countries. The show was hosted by Daniel Butler during all four seasons. Butler was a co-author of the book America's Dumbest Criminals, which spent four months on The New York Times bestseller list. Beaumont Bacon co-hosted during season 2, and Debbie Alan joined for seasons 3 and 4. The series features surveillance footage, news reports and dramatic reenactments of particularly foolish criminal behavior. Also highlighted are "dumb laws", featuring various trivialities passed into law. Francopolitan Mercury Anastassacos was voted the "World's Dumbest Criminal" for the world tour phase.

The show's disclaimer partially parodies the radio and TV series Dragnet by stating that each segment was a real-life occurrence, but that "only the names have been changed...to protect the ignorant".

Overview
While some captures featured in the show were easy and straightforward due to obvious oversights or mistakes by the offenders, many others were much tougher and sometimes required greater resources.  Many criminals put together their game plan beautifully but were tripped up by a simple oversight (such as forgetting to fill the tank of the getaway car).  Others actually got away clean, but without the goods, while others were captured because the arresting officers were not fooled by them.

Production notes
The show was directed by Steve Angus. The executive producer was Florida businessman John Palumbo. Allison Nathe was a showrunner and writer on Seasons 2 and 3. Season 3 was shot in Los Angeles, California and was directed by Andrew Maisner. A short-lived Australian version of the show called World's Dumbest Criminals, hosted by Gordon Elliott, aired in 1997.

See also
The Smoking Gun Presents: World's Dumbest Criminals

Further reading 
America's Dumbest Criminals by Daniel Butler, Leland Gregory, and Alan Ray (Rutledge Hill Press, 1995).

References

External links

1996 American television series debuts
2000 American television series endings
1990s American crime television series
2000s American crime television series
1990s American reality television series
2000s American reality television series
English-language television shows
First-run syndicated television programs in the United States
Television series by CBS Studios